Angel is a 1992 perfume from Thierry Mugler and the first modern gourmand perfume, with notes of patchouli, praline, red berries, and vanilla. The perfumiers were Olivier Cresp and Yves de Chirin. The design of its bottle is an irregular shaped star.

Angel along with the company's companion scent Alien account for $280 million in annual sales. The perfume continued to be produced after Mugler's luxury monobrand women's line folded. As of 2011, the fragrance was the fifth best-selling perfume of all time in the United States, according to The NPD Group. It once surpassed Chanel's No. 5 fragrance as the best-selling perfume in France, and remains one of the best-selling perfumes in Europe.

Awards 
FiFi Award Hall of Fame 2007

References

Perfumes
Products introduced in 1992
1992 establishments in France
20th-century perfumes
Designer perfumes